Joey Gutierrez is a writer and producer of sitcoms for American television. His writing credits include Married... with Children, Murphy Brown, Martin, The Drew Carey Show, Yes, Dear and Still Standing. A former stand-up comedian who began performing at the age of sixteen, he also wrote many of Jerry's routines in the early seasons of Seinfeld. He was a co-executive producer of Yes, Dear, and then became executive producer of Still Standing, along with co-creator Diane Burroughs. Gutierrez is also a member of The Magic Castle. He is represented by the United Talent Agency.

Writing credits 
 Married... with Children
"The Agony of Defeet" (1990)
 Martin
"I've Got a Secret" (1992)
"Baby You Can Drive My Car" (1993)
"Got To Be There" (1993)
"Holiday Blues" (1993)
"Love is in Your Face, Part 2" (1994)
"I Don't Have the Heart" (1994)
"Martin Gets Paid" (1994)
"Movin' on In" (1994)
"High Noon" (1995)
 Murphy Brown
"Brown in Toyland" (1994)
 Bless This House (US)
"Company Loves Misery" (1995)
"A Fight a Day Keeps the Doctor Away" (1995)
"Natural Born Parents" (1996)
 The Drew Carey Show
"Mimi's Day Parade" (1996)
"It's Your Party and I'll Crash If I Want To" (1996)
"Man's Best Same Sex Companion" (1997)
"Win a Date with Kate" (1997)
"A Very, Very, Very Fine House" (1997)
"Howdy Neighbor" (1998)
"My Best Friend's Wedding" (1998)
"Nicki's Wedding" (1998)
"Y2K, You're Okay" (1999)
 Yes, Dear
"Greg's Big Day" (2000)
"Jimmy Gets a Job" (2000)
"Jimmy's Jimmy" (2001)
"The Daddies Group" (2001)
"No Room to Spare" (2001)
"Christine's Journey" (2001)
"Kentucky Top Hat" (2001)
"Greg's Promotion" (2002)
 Still Standing
"Pilot" (2002)
"Still in School" (2002)
"Still Negotiating" (2003)
"Still Looking for Love" (2004)
"Still Graduating" (2006)
 Rita Rocks
"Lies, Lies, Lies, Yeah-ah" (2008)
"Under Pressure" (2008)
"I Write The Songs" (2008)
"What's Love Got To Do with It" (2009)
"Breaking Up is Hard to Do" (2009)
"Vogue" (2009)
"Bad Company" (2009)
"Anchors Weight" (2009)
 Retired at 35
"Hit It and Quit It" (2011)
"The Gifters" (2012)
 Raising Hope
"The Walk for the Runs" (2012)
"The Old Girl" (2013)
"Burt Bucks" (2013)
"The One Where They Get High" (2013)
 Last Man Standing
"Big Shots" (2014)
"Kyle's Friend" (2015)
"Polar Run" (2016)
 The Kids Are Alright
"Little Cyst" (2018)
"The Love List" (2019)

Producing credits 
 Bless This House (US)(1995) - Producer
 The Norm Show (1999) - Consulting Producer
 Yes, Dear (2000) - Co-executive Producer
 Still Standing (2002) - Executive Producer
 Rita Rocks (2008) - Consulting Producer
 Retired at 35 (2011) - Consulting Producer
 The Exes (2011) - Consulting Producer
 Raising Hope (2012) - Executive Producer
 Last Man Standing (2014) - Executive Producer
 The Kids Are Alright (2018) - Consulting Producer

References

Sources 

 'The Major Players in Still Standing' (USA Today)
 'Duo Standing Tall in 20th Deal' (Variety)

1963 births
Living people
Television producers from Illinois
American television writers
American male television writers
People from Calumet City, Illinois
Screenwriters from Illinois